Brooke Fletcher is an on-air talent for Apple TV+, Bally Sports, and the Big Ten Network. She co-hosts the Bally Sports show The Rally and previously covered the Detroit Tigers, Detroit Red Wings, and Detroit Pistons for Bally Sports Detroit. Her father is Scott Fletcher, who played 15 seasons in Major League Baseball including his final season for Tigers in 1995. He’s currently a minor league instructor for the Tigers. Her brother-in-law is Gordon Beckham, who played for the Tigers in the 2019 season.

Early life and college
Fletcher was born in Milwaukee, Wisconsin while her dad was playing for the Milwaukee Brewers. Her family moved to Georgia when she was two. She graduated from Starr's Mill High School in 2010, and went to Auburn University. She majored in business marketing and minored in Spanish, was in a sorority, Phi Mu and was involved in Auburn’s television station, Eagle Eye TV.

Career

Pageantry
She was Miss Georgia USA in 2015 and Miss Georgia Teen USA in 2009, and first runner-up for Miss Teen USA 2009. In Miss USA 2015, Fletcher competed against fellow future sportscaster Katie George of Kentucky.

Sports reporting
Fletcher started her career at ESPN in production then covered college sports on ESPNU and the SEC Network. In 2018, she joined Bally Sports Detroit as a host and reporter on Tigers, Red Wings, and Pistons broadcasts. She left Bally Sports Detroit in 2022 to co-host The Rally on Bally Sports. She also joined Apple TV+ for their coverage of the Major League Baseball games and the Big Ten Network for their college football coverage in 2022.

References

External links

American beauty pageant winners
Fox Sports
Mass media people from Georgia (U.S. state)
Auburn University alumni
Living people
Year of birth missing (living people)
ESPN people
People from Milwaukee
American sports journalists
Women sports journalists